John or Jon Holmes may refer to:

People

Arts and entertainment 
John Holmes (actor) (1944–1988), American pornographic film star and suspect in the Wonderland Murders case
John Holmes (composer) (died 1629), English cathedral musician and Renaissance composer
John Holmes (poet) (1904–1962), American poet
John Clellon Holmes (1926–1988), American Beat poet, novelist and essayist
John Eric Holmes (1930–2010), American author and promoter of fantasy role-playing games
John W. Holmes (film editor) (1917–2001), American film editor, nominated at the 44th Academy Awards
Jon Holmes (born 1969), British comedy writer and broadcaster

Diplomacy 
John Holmes (British diplomat) (born 1951), British diplomat
John T. Holmes, Canadian ambassador to Indonesia and East Timor
John Wendell Holmes (1910–1988), Canadian diplomat and academic

Education 
John Holmes (geographer), Australian professor of geography in University of Queensland
John Holmes (schoolmaster) (1703–1760), English schoolmaster
John Clough Holmes (1809–1887), American merchant and progenitor of the Agricultural College of the State of Michigan

Military or mercenary service
John Holmes (British Army officer) (born 1949), British general
John Holmes (mercenary), 19th century Anglo-Indian mercenary
John Holmes (Royal Navy officer) (1640?–1683), English naval officer

Politics 
John Holmes (by 1529 – 1583), MP for Ripon and Boroughbridge
John Holmes (died 1556 or later), MP for Rye
John Holmes (Maine politician) (1773–1843), member of the U.S. Senate and U.S. House of Representatives from Maine 
John Holmes (New Zealand politician) (1831–1910), New Zealand Member of Parliament
John Holmes (Nova Scotia politician) (1789–1876), Canadian Senator
John Holmes (Ontario politician) (1828–1879), Canadian MP
John Bee Holmes (1760–1827), intendant (mayor) of Charleston, South Carolina
John Edwin Holmes (1809–1863), first Lieutenant Governor of Wisconsin
John Robert Holmes (1927–2011), Canadian MP
John Holmes (Jamaican politician), planter, slave-owner and member of the House of Assembly of Jamaica

Religion
John Holmes (bishop) (died 1904), Anglican colonial bishop
John Andrew Holmes (1874-1937), American churchman & author
John Haynes Holmes (1879–1964), American churchman and pacifist
John McClellan Holmes (1834–1911), Christian minister and author

Sports 
John Holmes (footballer) (1869–?), English footballer
Jackie Holmes (John Holmes, 1920–1995), American race car driver
Rodney Holmes (John Rodney Reay Holmes, 1924–1980), English cricketer
Johnny Holmes, American baseball player of the 1940s
John Holmes (rugby league) (1952–2009), English former rugby league footballer
J. B. Holmes (John Bradley Holmes, born 1982), American golfer

Other fields
John Holmes (essayist) (1815–1894), radical campaigner in Leeds
John Holmes (Messenger of the Plymouth Court) (1603–?), Plymouth Colony settler and official
John Henry Holmes (1857–1935), English electrical engineer, inventor and Quaker
John Dalrymple Edgar Holmes, British veterinary scientist and bacteriologist

Fictional characters
Auguste Lupa, also known as John Hamish Adler Holmes, a fictional character in two pastiche novels by author John Lescroart

See also
John Cecil Holm (1904–1981), American dramatist
John Holm (born 1947), Canadian politician 
Jack Holmes (disambiguation)
Jonathan Holmes (disambiguation)